Bogachyovo is a rural locality (a village) in Ishmurzinsky Selsoviet, Baymaksky District, Bashkortostan, Russia. The population was 254 as of 2010. There are 2 streets.

Geography 
Bogachyovo is located 25 km south of Baymak (the district's administrative centre) by road. Pervomayskoye is the nearest rural locality.

References 

Rural localities in Baymaksky District